The 2022 New Mexico wildfire season is an ongoing series of wildfires burning throughout the U.S. state of New Mexico. ,  had burned across the state. The burned acreage figure for 2022 is well above the 1995-2015 average of approximately 270,000 acres burned annually. with the fire season in the state expected to continue until the advent of the regular North American Monsoon weather pattern throughout the Southwestern United States in the summer.

A number of factors contributed to the severe wildfire season. The majority of the state is experiencing extreme to exceptional drought conditions as part of a broader severe drought in the North American west, fueled by climate change. A reduced 2021-2022 winter snowpack, long periods of higher-than-normal temperatures, and sustained strong winds have resulted in extreme fire conditions and a number of major incidents.

The season has seen a large number of significant wildfires. In early April 2022, the McBride Fire destroyed over 200 structures and killed two people. Since April 2022, the Calf Canyon/Hermits Peak Fire grew to become the largest fire in New Mexico history. It destroyed over 900 structures. Thousands of state residents were forced to evacuate for extended periods of times, and the fires produced smoke plumes with severe effects on air quality and health throughout New Mexico.

List of wildfires
The following is a list of fires that burned more than 1,000 acres (400 ha), produced significant structural damage or casualties, or were otherwise notable.

See also
2022 Texas wildfires
Wildfires in 2022

References

Wildfires
2022 meteorology
Lists of wildfires in the United States
2022